Linda George  (born 11 February 1964 in Baghdad, Iraq) is an Assyrian-American singer known for her sentimental ballads and dance songs. The vast majority of her songs are sung in her native Assyrian language, though a few are in English and Arabic.

George is one of the most well-known and ubiquitous Assyrian singers, having toured the continents of Oceania, Europe and Asia. Furthermore, she is the most liked Assyrian figure on Facebook. In 2010, Esquire magazine chose George as the representative from Iraq in a special, 194-nation edition of their Sexiest Woman Alive feature.

Musical style
Unlike many other comparative Assyrian artists, George has dabbled with popular American music genres such as R&B, urban and electronic dance music in her career. Her Assyrians songs generally range from lush romantic ballads to traditional folk dance and as well as patriotic music.

Biography

Linda has been singing since she was a little girl: her career began at the age of five. She was the church choir soloist in Baghdad, where she appeared on national television. She moved to Amman, Jordan in 1979. Later that year, she migrated to the US, where her career started in the Assyrian community in Chicago.

She was discovered by Assyrian singer Sargon Gabriel. Sargon featured Linda on his track "Dalaleh". The track became a popular record in the Assyrian community and helped George land her own album. George's first album, Hal Eiman, was released in 1983 and instantly was a success. George continued her success into the early 1990s, and became the first Assyrian singer to use contemporary beats with traditional Assyrian singing.

After dabbling with different beats and contemporary mixes on her three previous albums, George changed the way of Assyrian Music on her seventh Album, "Khamra Tiqa" released in 1993. The album, featuring the song "Matlab D'Libba", featured the first rapping in Assyrian music. The song, dubbed the "Chapeh Chapeh Song" became successful. The album's other standout track however was "Barwar", released after the Gulf War in which the region of Barwari in Northern Iraq was bombed and left in ruin.

In the mid to late 1990s, George released two albums. Her last studio album of the decade was 1995's "Khoot Golpaneh D'Malakha". The album contained a little bit of everything that Linda's previous albums featured, such as traditional music, upbeat contemporary beats, ballads and dance hits. On April 2001, in the Assyrian New Year, she made her historical tour to Northern Iraq, where she was welcomed by over 20,000 Assyrian fans. In 2005, after Saddam Hussein was deposed as the leader of Iraq, Linda released "I am Free", an EP sung in Arabic with four songs. The lead single, "Ana Hurra", was released worldwide as an anthem for the newly liberated Iraq.

As she toured Australia for the 22nd time in 2010, she was able to finish videotaping one of her hits on this album, "Madeleey", which was filmed in the Royal National Park. Linda George currently resides in Chicago.

Discography

 1983 – Hal Eiman ("How Long?")
 1984 – Kursia D'Malkoota ("The Kingdom's Throne")
 1986 – Melodies from North of My Country [sic]
 1988 – Warda Bil Drananeh D'Khubba ("Flower on the Shoulders of Love")
 1988 – Kinara D'Roukha ("Harp of the Soul")
 1989 – Alahta D'Khubba, Shupra O Khaila ("Goddess of Love, Beauty and Power")
 1992 – Kuma W'Khwara ("Black and White")
 1993 – Khamra Tiqa ("Old Wine")
 1995 – Khoot Golpaneh D'Malakha ("Beneath the Wings of an Angel")
 1996 – Peace on Earth
 1997 – The Golden Collection
 1999 – Colors of My Country
 2001 – No Quarter (English single)
 2003 – Silence of a Valley
 2005 – Anaa Hurra ("I Am Free", Arabic EP)
 2007 – Doushi ("My Honey")
 2010 – Mokhneeten Minokh ("I Miss You")
 2010 – Pearls of The East
 2013 – Linda George & Friends
 2014 – Saariq al-Malakoot ("The Thief of the Kingdom", Arabic single)
 2015 – Poolada ("Steel")
 2017 – Lela Khteeta ("It's Not a Sin")

Notes

References

External links
Official Linda George site
Official Facebook page

Assyrian musicians
Iraqi emigrants to the United States
20th-century Iraqi women singers
Musicians from Baghdad
21st-century Iraqi women singers
Iraqi Assyrian people
Syriac-language singers
Living people
Musicians from Chicago
1964 births
Iraqi Christians
Arabic-language singers